Franko Šango (born 22 May 1992) is a Croatian professional basketball player. Standing at 2.01 m, he plays as a swingman. He last played for Vrijednosnice Osijek of the Croatian League.

External links
 Profile at abaliga.com
 Profile at eurobasket.com
 Profile at realGM.com

Living people
1992 births
ABA League players
Croatian men's basketball players
KK Zadar players
KK Zagreb players
KK Vrijednosnice Osijek players
Small forwards
Shooting guards
Basketball players from Zadar
KK Jazine Arbanasi players